Wiesław Wojno (born 28 August 1955) is a retired Polish football manager.

References

1955 births
Living people
Polish football managers
Zagłębie Lubin managers
Wisła Płock managers
Śląsk Wrocław managers
ŁKS Łódź managers
KSZO Ostrowiec Świętokrzyski managers